Simón Andreu Trobat (born 1 January 1941) is a Spanish actor. He has appeared in more than 180 films and television shows since 1961. In 2013 he was awarded with the Nosferatu Award at the Festival Internacional de Cinema Fantàstic de Catalunya for his long career.

Selected filmography

 Rocío from La Mancha (1963)
 The Good Love (1963)
 Constance aux enfers  (1963)
 Ballad of a Bounty Hunter (1968)
 Forbidden Photos of a Lady Above Suspicion (1970)
 Death Walks on High Heels (1971)
 Bad Man's River (1971)
 Spaniards in Paris (1971)
 The Blood Spattered Bride (1972)
 Death Walks at Midnight (1972)
 Those Dirty Dogs (1973)
 Children of Rage (1975)
 Hidden Pleasures (1977)
 El sacerdote (1979)
 Flesh+Blood (1985)
 El viaje a ninguna parte (1986)
 Fine Gold (1989)
 Prince of Shadows (1991)
 The Shooter (1995)
 The Sea (2000)
 Die Another Day (2002) - Dr. Alvarez
 Beyond Re-Animator (2003)
 Bridget Jones: The Edge of Reason (2004) 
 Eyes of Crystal (2004)
 Nero (2005)
 The Chronicles of Narnia: Prince Caspian (2008) - Lord Scythley
 Little Ashes (2008) - Fernando de Valle
 I Come with the Rain (2009)
 The Way (2010) - Don Santiago
 The Cold Light of Day (2012) - Pizarro
 Prim, el asesinato de la calle del Turco (2014) - General Serrano
 The Infiltrator (2016) - Gonzalo Mora Sr.
 Wild Oats (2016) - Manager
 The Promise (2016) - Old Peasant Man
 Verano Rojo (2017) - Abuelo
 Las Chicas Del Cable (2017, TV Series) - Ricardo Cifuentes
 Josephine (2021)

References

External links

1941 births
Living people
People from Sa Pobla
Spanish male film actors
20th-century Spanish male actors